The Saw Is the Law is an EP by German thrash metal band Sodom, released in 1991.

Track listing

Personnel
 Tom Angelripper  - vocals, bass
 Michael Hoffman - guitars
 Chris Witchhunter - drums

1991 EPs
Sodom (band) EPs
Thrash metal EPs
Albums produced by Harris Johns